Wai used to be a VDC in Bajura District. Now it is the part of Swamikartik Rural Municipality of Sudurpashchim Province, Nepal.

Previously this VDC had ward no. 1 to 9. Now all these ward have been merged and formed ward no. 4 and 5 of Swamikartik Rural Municipality.
People residing here belongs to Chhetri, Kami, Brahmin, Damai, Sarki, Limbu etc. It is one of the remote place of Bajura District.

Populated places in Bajura District
Village development committees (Nepal)